Al-Furqan (The Criterion) is the 25th chapter (sūrah) of the Qur'an with 77 verses (āyāt). The name Al-Furqan, or "The Criterion" refers to the Qur'an itself as the decisive factor between good and evil. This Surah is named Al-Furqan from the word appearing in the 1st ayat.

The chapter emphasizes (25:68–70) that there is no sin, however great, that cannot be forgiven if sincerely repented, showing faith and working with righteous deeds.

The al-Furqan refers to the Torah, saying "We sent Moses The Book, and appointed his brother Aaron with him as minister" (Sura 25, verse 35).

Summary
1 God praised for the Quran
2 The one God a sovereign Creator and Ruler
3-4 The idolaters worship gods that are helpless
5-6 The Quran said to be Muhammad's own forgery
7 Muhammad protests that the Quran is from God
8-9 Unbelievers reject Muhammad because he is like other men
9 Muhammad said to be a madman
10 God comforts Muhammad on account of these calumnies
11-16 Unbelievers doomed to hell-fire
16-17 The reward of the pious in Paradise
18-21 Even the false gods will desert their worshippers in the judgment-day
22 The former prophets were all like Muhammad
23 The blasphemous unbelief of the Quraish
24-25 They shall be punished and their works demolished
26-32 Relative condition of the faithful and the unbelievers in the resurrection
33 Former prophets had their enemies among unbelievers
34-36 The Quran sent down by piecemeal a stumbling-stone to infidels, but a comfort to believers
37-38 Those who accused Moses and Aaron of imposture were destroyed
39 Noah's calumniators drowned
40-42 Adites, Thamúdites, and Sodomites destroyed for infidelity
43-45 The Quraish warned in vain by these examples
46-52 God's works testify to his being
53 God could have sent a preacher to every city
54 Muhammad not to obey the will of infidels
55-56 God the Creator and Ruler of all things
57 Unbelievers worship idols and assist Satan
58 Muhammad sent to be a preacher and a warner
59 Muhammad only desires the conversion of his people
۩ 60 He is exhorted to trust the merciful Creator and Ruler of heaven and earth
61 The infidels refuse to worship the God of Muhammad
62-63 God praised for his benevolent works
64-68 The servants of God described
69-71 Wicked men saved by repentance and good works
72-74 True penitents described
75-76 Their reward in Paradise
77 God reprobates the Quraish

Analysis
The Surah manages the questions and doubts that were being raised against the Quran, the Prophethood of Muhammad, and his lessons by the disbelievers of Mecca. Suitable responses to every single objection are revealed in the surah and the individuals have been cautioned of the results of dismissing the Truth. The significant issues, divine laws, and directly follows the following order in the surah:- 
 The Quran is the rule, the criterion i.e. Al-Furqan to distinguish between the right and the wrong.  
 Transgressors are the individuals who dismiss Reality, distrust the Rasool, and preclude the Day of Judgment and hereafter.  
 Upon the arrival of Judgment Day, those False-deities worshiped by the mushriks will declare no divinity and consider the mushrikis answerable for their shirk, on the Judgement Day.  
 The disbelievers will lament not opting for the Righteous Path upon the arrival of Judgment Day.  
 Sequential, gradual, and bit-by-bit disclosure of the Quran is a pearl of wisdom.  
 Allah's decree is commanded to make Jihad against unbelief in the Quran.  
 Qualities of genuine devotees are portrayed. 

Toward the finish of the Surah, a description of the character of a true believer is given at the start of Surah Al-Mu'minoon. According to Abul A'la Maududi
 Here is the criterion for distinguishing the genuine from the counterfeit. This is the noble character of those people who have believed in and followed the teachings of the Holy Prophet and this is the kind of people that he is trying to train. You may yourselves compare and contrast this type of people with those Arabs, who have not as yet accepted the Message, and who are upholding "ignorance" and exerting their utmost to defeat the Truth. Now you may judge for yourselves as to which you would like to choose." Though this question was not posed in so many words, it was placed before everyone in Arabia in a tangible shape. It may be noted that during the next few years, the practical answer given to this question by the whole nation, with the exception of a small minority, was that they chose Islam.

Time of Revelation
It shows up from its style and topic that it was additionally uncovered during the third phase of Prophethood at Makkah like Surah Al-Mu'minun.

Parts of Q25:14-27 are preserved in the Ṣan‘ā’1 lower text.

See also 
 List of Islamic texts

Notes

References

External links 
Quran 25 Clear Quran translation
Q25:2, 50+ translations, islamawakened.com

Furqan